The 2023 CONCACAF Gold Cup qualification tournament will determine the final three teams to qualify for the 2023 CONCACAF Gold Cup.

Teams
Twelve teams will participate in the 2023 CONCACAF Gold Cup Qualifiers based on the results of the 2022–23 CONCACAF Nations League. These teams are the four group third-placed teams of 2022–23 CONCACAF Nations League A, four second-place finishers from League B and four group winners from League C.

Draw and schedule
The final draw is scheduled to be held on 14 April 2023.

Qualified teams

1 Bold indicates champions for that year. Italic indicates hosts for that year.

References 

Qualifiers
2023 Gold Cup
Gold Cup qual